Howard Franklin is an American screenwriter and film director, known for such films as The Name of the Rose and his three collaborations with Bill Murray: Quick Change, Larger than Life, and The Man Who Knew Too Little. His other films include The Public Eye, about a 1940s tabloid photographer modeled on the photojournalist Weegee and starring Joe Pesci; Someone to Watch Over Me The Man Who Knew Too Little. and The Big Year.

Filmography

References

External links 
 

American film directors
Place of birth missing (living people)
American male screenwriters
Comedy film directors
Year of birth missing (living people)
Living people